Whitebrook Halt was a request stop on the former Wye Valley Railway. It was opened in 1927 to serve the village of Whitebrook. It was closed in 1959 when passenger services were withdrawn from the Wye Valley Railway. The station came too late to make full use out of the village's industry. Whitebrook had once been home to three paper mills. However, paper making ceased in Whitebrook in the early 1880s, only four years after the line opened in 1876. The halt was not built until long after the closure of the paper mills.

References

Disused railway stations in Monmouthshire
Transport in Monmouthshire
History of Monmouthshire
Former Great Western Railway stations
Railway stations in Great Britain opened in 1927
Railway stations in Great Britain closed in 1959